The Precious Heritage Art Gallery and Cultural Museum is a museum in Hoi An, Vietnam. Inaugurated on 1 January 2017, the museum presents the diverse cultures of Vietnam's ethnic groups through large-scale portraits, traditional costumes, stories and public education. The Precious Heritage Museum is the culmination of the Precious Heritage Project, a photographic endeavor undertaken over a decade by the French photographer Réhahn.

Mission   
The mission of the Precious Heritage Art Gallery and Museum is to promote the preservation and importance of Vietnam's ethnic groups through cultural understanding and respect.

Origin 

Réhahn began the Precious Heritage Project while voyaging through North Vietnam as a travel photographer in 2011. After meeting several tribes around Sapa, he learned that there are more than 54 different ethnic groups throughout the country. What separates each group from one another can be their multitude of languages with different linguistic roots; their diverse heritage costumes and handicrafts; architectural traditions; and religious beliefs. The ethnic traditions were changing as younger generations moved away from their villages. Dialects, traditional garments and other elements of their cultural heritage were slowly declining.

As Réhahn traveled through these remote villages and began to collect portraits of members of each group in their traditional costumes, he decided to create a place dedicated to Vietnam's ethnic groups in order to preserve some of this cultural heritage. The Precious Heritage Art Gallery and Museum opened in 2017. It is completely financed by Réhahn and is free to the public.

In September 2019, Réhahn completed his primary mission of researching, meeting, and documenting each of the 54 ethnic groups in Vietnam. The museum now represents all 54 groups and numerous sub-groups, some of whom are not documented elsewhere.

Building 
The Precious Heritage Museum is located in a 19th-century French house, which has been classified as historic architecture by the city of Hoi An.

Permanent collection 
The Precious Heritage Museum holds a comprehensive collection of ethnic costumes, artifacts, stories, and portraits of the 54+ diverse ethnic groups in Vietnam.

The collection includes more than 200 photographs of Vietnam, including the formal portrait series of each of the 54 ethnic groups in their traditional tribal garments. Thirty-eight original costumes are present, some of which are among the last of their kind. This textile collection was established in large part thanks to the donations of the chiefs of many of the ethnic groups. 

The cultural patrimony and art/documentary photographs were collected over nearly a decade of research by Réhahn while he traveled throughout the country's ethnic villages in South, Central, and Northern Vietnam.

Each photograph and costume is accompanied by stories of Réhahn's encounter with the tribal member and facts about the ethnic groups. It is complemented by videos about the making of the costumes. The museum also includes a room dedicated to information about the indigo dyeing process used by many tribal groups such as the Dao and Hmong.

Traveling collection 
Part of the collection was presented during the International Fair of Caen, from 16 to 26 September 2016.

Press 
The Precious Heritage Museum was included in The New York Times article “36 Hours in Hoi An.” It is also listed as “an essential detour” by Lonely Planet.

The Precious Heritage Project was the subject of articles in the BBC, GEO, National Geographic and other international press sources.

References

External links 

 
 
 

Ethnographic museums
Hoi An
Museums in Hoi An
Photography museums and galleries in Vietnam
2017 establishments in Vietnam